Ionuț Ramba (born 8 February 1991) is a Romanian handballer who plays for CSM București and the Romania national team.

References

1991 births
Living people
People from Făgăraș
Romanian male handball players
Romanian expatriate sportspeople in Germany
Expatriate handball players